The Institute of Public Enterprise (IPE) was established in 1964 for the study of issues and policies relating to public enterprise (PEs). S S Khera, ICS, the Cabinet Secretary, Government of India, had conceived the idea of a research institution that would undertake a systematic and sustained study of issues relevant to the formulation of policies towards public enterprises. In the early sixties, when PEs were designed as the principal instrument to serve the social and economic objectives of development, Khera felt a need for an institute that would collect information on PEs, study issues, and undertake consultancy and training for PEs.

V.V. Ramanadham, professor and head of the Department of Commerce, Osmania University, translated Khera's concept into IPE, with support and guidance from D. S Reddy, Vice-Chancellor, Osmania University as an autonomous, non-profit society.

Management education started in 1980 with the start of a three-year part-time MBA(PE) programme. In 1995, the institute started a two-year full-time Post Graduate Diploma in Business Management (PGDBM). Currently, the institute offers various 2 year PGP courses, namely Post Graduation Diploma in Management(PGDM), PGDM – Marketing, PGDM – Banking, Insurance & Finance, PGDM – Human Resource Management, and PGDM – International Business, the courses are recognized by AICTE

Recognition
The Indian Council of Social Science Research (ICSSR) has recognized IPE as a "Centre of Excellence" in management sciences for doctoral studies. Seven universities have recognized the institute for the guidance of Ph.D. students in the field of Commerce, Economics, Management & Public Administration. IPE is a training centre for the IAS and other senior officers of central and state governments, public sector enterprises, and the private corporate sector.

Awards
1.has been awarded for its outstanding partnership in the delivery of the IICA Certificate Programme (ICP) in CSR by the Indian Institute of Corporate Affairs, IICA, Manesar Gurgaon.

2.Dr. R K Mishra was conferred with “CSR Eminent Directors of Leading Institutes Award” for the year 2016.

3.Institute of Public Enterprise (IPE) has been awarded the Five Star category recognition by Green Rating for Integrated Habitat Assessment (GRIHA) in its convention on February2016, in New Delhi.

See also

 List of business schools in Hyderabad, India

References

 Institute of Public Enterprise

External links 
 www.ipeindia.org/

Research institutes in Hyderabad, India
Business schools in Hyderabad, India
1964 establishments in Andhra Pradesh
Research institutes established in 1964